Anoplius nigerrimus is one of the most common spider wasps, or pompilids, in Europe. They are mostly black and the females are 6–8 mm long while males measure 5–8 mm. This species may be distinguished from the related Anoplius concinnus and Anoplius caviventris by the 20 setae, or hairs, on the forehead rather than 60 or 45.

Distribution
A. nigerrimus can be found from Northern and Central Europe eastwards across Asia to the Pacific Coast and in North America from the Yukon to Newfoundland.  It is one of the most common spider wasps found in Great Britain and Ireland.

Habitat
Unlike other species of the genus Anoplius, A. nigerrimus does not show a preference for damp habitats and occurs in drier habitats such as grassland and scrub, the males are frequently encountered running over short vegetation.

Biology
The flight period in Great Britain is May to September, although in northern California adults have been collected in May, June and July. Prey collected by A. nigerrimus include spiders from the families Lycosidae, Gnaphosidae and Pisauridae. A nigerrimus builds nests under stones, in cavities in stone walls, in hollow plant stems, in deserted burrows of ants, bees or wasps, and in empty snail shells. It can also dig a burrow and build cells in friable soil. One nest of four cells was found under a stone on moorland at an altitude of 400 m in Glen Tilt, near Blair Atholl, Perthshire. Flowers visited include umbellifers such as wild carrot and Heracleum sphondylium.  The eulophid wasp, Tetrastichus pompilicola has been reared from larvae of A. nigerrimus in Newfoundland.

References

Hymenoptera of Europe
Pompilinae
Insects described in 1763
Taxa named by Giovanni Antonio Scopoli